The  was a class of submarine chasers of the Imperial Japanese Navy (IJN), serving during and after World War II. Nine vessels were built between 1937 and 1939 under the Maru 3 Programme.

Design
Developed under project number was K7, the No.4 class submarine chaser was an improved variant of the No.3 class, with increased freeboard. Other general features were the same as the No.3 class. Their design was elaborate, because the Navy Technical Department (Kampon) devoted itself to making them small. However, the design was not able to accept additional anti-aircraft guns and depth charges.

Ships in class

Footnotes

Bibliography
Ships of the World special issue Vol.45, Escort Vessels of the Imperial Japanese Navy, (Japan), February 1996
The Maru Special, Japanese Naval Vessels No.49, Japanese submarine chasers and patrol boats,  (Japan), March 1981

 
World War II naval ships of Japan
Submarine chasers of the Imperial Japanese Navy
Submarine chaser classes